Louise Trevillyan is an American electronics engineer, research staff member at the  Design Automation Department, IBM Thomas J. Watson Research Center.

Trevillyan holds a B.A. and M.A. in Mathematics and an M.S. in Computer Science from the University of Michigan.

Awards and recognition
2012: ACM SIGDA Pioneering Achievement Award
 "Recognizing her almost-40-year career in EDA and her groundbreaking research contributions in logic and physical synthesis, design verification, high-level synthesis, processor performance analysis, and compiler technology" 
2008: Marie Pistilli Award
"The award honors Trevillyan for her extensive contributions to the field of EDA throughout her lengthy career, as a technologist and leader, and as a notable role model and mentor to others in the field.  <...> Throughout her more than 30-year career, Trevillyan has done extensive, groundbreaking research on logic and physical synthesis, design verification, high-level synthesis, processor performance analysis and compiler technology and holds 12 patents in design automation."
1996: IEEE Fellow  "for her pioneering work in logic synthesis."

References

Year of birth missing (living people)
Living people
Electronic design automation people
American electronics engineers
University of Michigan alumni
IBM employees
Electronic engineering award winners
Fellow Members of the IEEE